Full of Love is the fourteenth studio album by Japanese singer Shizuka Kudo. It was released on June 2, 1999, through Pony Canyon. The album features a contemporary R&B sound, produced by the likes of Chokkaku, Ichirō Hada and Seishirō Kusunose. It has been described as the perfect driving album for the summer.

Commercial performance
Full of Love debuted at number 38 on the Oricon Albums Chart, with 9,000 units sold in its first week. It charted at number 61 with 3,000 units sold on its second week, bringing its reported total at 12,000 copies.

Track listing

Charts

References

1999 albums
Shizuka Kudo albums
Pony Canyon albums